Giovanni Andrea Magliuolo (active 1580–1603) was an Italian painter, active in Naples, Italy.

Biography
He was active in the decoration of Santa Maria Donnaromita. He was a contemporary of Teodoro Errico, Cristiano de Noja, and Giovanni Vincenzo Forli.

References

Year of birth unknown
Year of death unknown
16th-century Italian painters
Italian male painters
17th-century Italian painters
Painters from Naples